Karun Kaladharan Nair (born 6 December 1991) is an Indian international cricketer who plays for Karnataka in domestic cricket and Rajasthan Royals in Indian Premier League. He is a right-handed top order batter and occasional off break bowler. He is only the second Indian batter to score a triple century in Test cricket.

He made his India debut in the 2016 away ODI against Zimbabwe. He made his Test debut against England in 2016.

Early life
Karun was born on 6 December 1991 in Jodhpur, Rajasthan. His parents Kaladharan Nair and Prema Nair hails from Chengannur in Alappuzha district of Kerala. Kaladharan, who is a mechanical engineer, was posted in Jodhpur at the time of his son's birth and later moved with his family to Koramangala, Bangalore where he also worked on the sprinkler system at the M. Chinnaswamy Stadium. Nair's mother, Prema is a teacher at Chinmaya Vidyalaya, Bangalore. Karun has an elder sister, Shruthi Nair.

Born as a premature baby, Karun's parents were advised by the doctors to introduce their son to sports as part of the treatment for his weak lungs. Nair joined Koramangala Cricket Academy on 28 March 2001, a year after his family moved to Bengaluru and was coached under Shivanand. He studied at Chinmaya Vidyalaya, were his mother taught until fourth grade and switched to the Frank Anthony Public School for better cricketing opportunities. He studied BCom (Hons) at Jain University in Bangalore. He is fluent in several languages : English, Hindi, Malayalam, Kannada and Tamil. His mother-tongue is Malayalam.

Domestic career
Nair made his first-class debut in the 2013–14 season in which Karnataka won the Ranji Trophy. He scored three consecutive centuries in their final league game and the first-two knockout matches. He went through a lean patch in the 2014–15 season with a string of low scores but bounced back smashing 328 runs in the final helping Karnataka to win the title again. He also became the second player from Karnataka to score a triple century and the first batter to score a triple century in a Ranji final since 1946–47. It was also the highest total by a batter in the final of Ranji Trophy. He scored 500 runs in the 2015–16 Ranji Trophy including two centuries and two half-centuries. He continued his good run in the next season hitting one century and three half-centuries from his six appearances in the season.

In October 2018, he was named in India A's squad for the 2018–19 Deodhar Trophy. The following month, he was named as one of eight players to watch ahead of the 2018–19 Ranji Trophy. In August 2019, he was named in the India Red team's squad for the 2019–20 Duleep Trophy.

International career
Nair was named in the Indian ODI and T20I squads for their series against Zimbabwe in May 2016 and made his One Day International (ODI) debut in the series at Harare Sports Club on 11 June 2016.

On 26 November 2016, he made his Test debut against England at Mohali. He scored his maiden Test century in the final match of the series at the M. A. Chidambaram Stadium, going on to finish 303 not out. He was only three innings old in international cricket then, thus becoming the quickest batsman to hit a maiden triple-hundred in Test cricket history in term of number of matches played. He was also India's second ever triple-centurion after Virender Sehwag, and only the third man in the game's history to convert a maiden Test ton into a triple. India won the match by an innings and 75 runs, and Nair was named as the player of the match.

Indian Premier League
Karun was a part of Royal Challengers Bangalore in the 2012 and 2013 seasons of Indian Premier League. He got his breakthrough season with Rajasthan Royals in the 2014 IPL scoring 330 runs in the season at a strike rate of 142.24.

In 2016, Delhi Daredevils signed Karun after Rajasthan was banned from the competition for two years after being found guilty in illegal betting and match-fixing probe. He captained Delhi in 3 matches after an injury to Zaheer Khan in the 2017 season.

He was bought by Kings XI Punjab in the 2018 IPL auction. In February 2021, Nair was bought by the Kolkata Knight Riders in the IPL auction ahead of the 2021 Indian Premier League. In February 2022, he returned to Rajasthan Royals in the auction for the 2022 Indian Premier League tournament.

Personal life
In July 2016, Karun survived a boat accident in river Pampa in Kerala during a thanksgiving temple visit after making his ODI debut.

He announced his engagement with longtime girlfriend Sanaya Tankariwala, a media professional on 29 June 2019 through his social media handles. The couple got married in a private ceremony at Udaipur, Rajasthan on 19 January 2020. Their son, Kayaan Nair was born in January 2022.

References

External links 
 
 Karun Nair at Wisden

1991 births
Delhi Capitals cricketers
India One Day International cricketers
India Test cricketers
Indian cricketers
Living people
People from Kerala
Rajasthan Royals cricketers
Royal Challengers Bangalore cricketers
India Green cricketers
Punjab Kings cricketers
Kolkata Knight Riders cricketers
Indian A cricketers